Yoann Bagot (born 6 September 1987) is a French former professional road bicycle racer, who competed professionally between 2011 and 2019 for the  and  teams. He was a member of the  team that competed at the 2013 Tour de France, where he withdrew in the third stage. His father, Jean-Claude Bagot was also a professional cyclist, best known for winning a stage of the 1987 Giro d'Italia.

Major results

2010
 1st Paris–Mantes-en-Yvelines
 4th Overall Tour des Pays de Savoie
2012
 8th Overall Tour de l'Ain
2013
 1st  Overall Tour du Gévaudan Languedoc-Roussillon
1st Stage 1
 2nd Overall Tour of Turkey
1st Stage 6
2014
 8th Overall Tour de l'Ain
 10th Tour du Finistère
2015
 4th Overall Tour du Gévaudan Languedoc-Roussillon
 7th Overall Tour de Luxembourg
 10th Overall Tour du Haut Var
2016
 5th Overall La Méditerranéenne
 10th Overall Rhône-Alpes Isère Tour
2017
 5th Overall Rhône-Alpes Isère Tour

Notes

References

External links
 
 
 

1987 births
Living people
French male cyclists
People from Salon-de-Provence
Presidential Cycling Tour of Turkey stage winners
Sportspeople from Bouches-du-Rhône
Cyclists from Provence-Alpes-Côte d'Azur
21st-century French people